The 2016 season was Sarawak's 4th season in Liga Super the top tier of Malaysian football since being promoted in 2014. Another gloomy season campaign for Bujang Senang after another trophy drought years. With improvement in league position by finishing 8th compared to previous season, but failed in both cup competitions, loss to Perak 3–1 in FA cup and finished bottom of the group in Malaysia Cup with later Champions, Kedah as group winner and behind feeder team, T team and JDT II.

With announcing former national head coach, Datuk K Rajagopal as new coach it seems like new beginning for Sarawak with the arrival of exciting young talent from national junior team, Syahrul Azwari. Unfortunately, he 'rested' in May, in Malaysian football culture if the coach verified as 'rested' surely soon later he will be sacked and his contract terminated by mutual consent.

Team Kit
After 5 years since 2011 played with red-black AC Milan strip for home games and blue-black Internazionale for away fixture. The management decided to re-introduce all red kit for home matches, the same pattern when the team kit was sponsored by Rossi during 2000's. Whereas, yellow neon kit introduced as away kit, the all black with tribal design was chosen for alternate or third kit.

Players

First-team squad

Transfers

1st leg

In:

Out:

2nd leg

In:

Out:

Statistics

Top scorers
The list is sorted by shirt number when total goals are equal.

References

Sarawak FA seasons
Malaysian football clubs 2016 season